San Martín de Valderaduey is a municipality located in the Sanabria comarca, province of Zamora, Castile and León, Spain. According to the 2004 census (INE), the municipality has a population of 86 inhabitants. The town's main church is from the 10th century.

References

Municipalities of the Province of Zamora